Tamuín National Airport  is an airport at Tamuín, San Luis Potosí, Mexico. It handles national air traffic for the city of Tamuín and Ciudad Valles.

Aeromar launched commercial operations to this airport in 2019, resulting in an increase of passenger movements to 4745 passengers, but 8 months later was cancelled due to the COVID-19 pandemic in Mexico. 

In 2021, the airport handled 1,545 passengers and 1,701 passengers in 2022.

Statistics

Passengers

See also 

List of the busiest airports in Mexico

References

External links
 Tamuín Intl. Airport

Airports in San Luis Potosí